Kemal Rıfat Kalpakçıoğlu (1899 – 7 September 1975) was a Turkish footballer. He played in nine matches for the Turkey national football team between 1924 and 1927.

References

External links
 

1899 births
1975 deaths
Turkish footballers
Turkey international footballers
Place of birth missing
Association football defenders
Galatasaray S.K. footballers
Footballers at the 1924 Summer Olympics
Olympic footballers of Turkey